"Just Got Lucky" is a song written and released by American heavy metal band Dokken on their 1984 album Tooth and Nail, reaching #27 on the Billboard mainstream rock chart.

In 1985, while Dokken toured with Dio in Hawaii, the band decided to film a video for the single, “Just Got Lucky”.  They wanted to film Lynch’s guitar solo atop an active volcano.  While filming, seismic activity developed and steam started coming up, making it difficult for him to breathe. He said he could feel the heat through his shoes, but continued playing on. As night fell, park rangers came to warn the band and crew they needed to leave immediately. They were on the plane when the volcano later blew, and the camera crew spent about an hour circling the eruption for extra footage.

The song was performed live in Tokyo, Japan in April 1988 and was released in November 1988 on Beast from the East. It was also included on the 1999 compilation, The Very Best of Dokken, and the 2006 album, The Definitive Rock Collection.

Track listing

Chart positions

Personnel
 Don Dokken – lead vocals
 George Lynch – guitar
 Jeff Pilson – bass guitar, backing vocals
 Mick Brown – drums

References

1984 singles
Dokken songs
Song recordings produced by Roy Thomas Baker
Song recordings produced by Tom Werman
Songs written by George Lynch (musician)
Songs written by Jeff Pilson
1984 songs
Elektra Records singles
Songs written by Don Dokken